Cambala is a genus of millipedes in the family Cambalidae. There are about 18 described species in Cambala.

Species
These 18 species belong to the genus Cambala:

 Cambala annulata (Say, 1821)
 Cambala arkansana Chamberlin, 1942
 Cambala arkansasa Chamberlin
 Cambala caeca Loomis, 1953
 Cambala captiosa Causey, 1959
 Cambala cara Causey, 1953
 Cambala cristula Loomis, 1938
 Cambala hubrichti Hoffman, 1958
 Cambala lactaria Gray, 1832
 Cambala minor Bollman, 1888
 Cambala nodulosa Butler, 1876
 Cambala ochra Chamberlin, 1942
 Cambala reddelli Causey, 1964
 Cambala saltillona Chamberlin, 1943
 Cambala speabia Causey, 1964
 Cambala speobia Chamberlin, 1953
 Cambala texana Loomis, 1938
 Cambala washingtonensis Causey, 1954

References

Further reading

 
 

Spirostreptida
Articles created by Qbugbot